Pirozhki (are foremost, Russian baked or fried yeast-leavened boat-shaped buns with a variety of fillings. Pirozhki are a popular street food and comfort food in Eastern Europe.

Terminology
(singular) is the diminutive form of Russian pirog, which means a full-sized pie. Pirozhki are not to be confused with the Polish pierogi (a cognate term), which are called  in Ukrainian and Russian.

Variations
A typical pirozhok is boat- or rarely crescent-shaped, made of yeast-leavened dough, with filling completely enclosed. Similar Russian pastries (pirogs) of other shapes include coulibiac, kalitka, rasstegai, and vatrushka.

Pirozhki are either fried or baked. They come in sweet or savory varieties. Common savory fillings include ground meat, mashed potato, mushrooms, boiled egg with scallions, or cabbage. Typical sweet fillings are fruit (apple, cherry, apricot, lemon), jam, or tvorog.

Baked pirozhki may be glazed with egg to produce golden color. Also they may be decorated with strips of dough.

Pirozhki are usually hand-sized. A smaller version may be served with soups.

Regional varieties

The Americas
Varieties of pirozhki were brought to the Americas by Volga Germans. Known today as bierock, pirok or runza, they belong to several regional cuisines in the United States, Canada and Argentina.  The populous Russian diaspora which came to the Americas as a consequence of the Russian Revolution and Civil War brought with them the more classic Russian versions of piroshki.

The Balkans
The Greek variety  is popular in parts of Greece, as brought by Pontic Greeks, and in most big cities, where they are sold as a type of fast food. The Greek  come fried with many different stuffings.

In Serbia the local variety are cylindrical pastries called /. They are stuffed with fillings such as ground spiced meat mix of pork and veal or cottage cheese, and with kulen, tomato sauce and herbs. Alternatively they are made from breaded crepes with variety of fillings.

The Baltics 
Other fillings are also possible. However the name  is not exclusive to these buns, but can refer to variety of other pastries, such as pies and turnovers.  were often eaten as lunch by farmers and shepherds working the fields.

Estonians (and Finns) too have this tradition. They are usually made with puff pastry. Open pies covering the scale of whole baking tray are also popular, more similar to American pies. Many recipes exist, with meat, cabbage, carrots, rice, egg and other fillings and filling mixtures also being used. Sweet fillings are as popular as savory  with fillings like apple, various berries, marzipan, various spices and jam.

South Caucasus
The Russian variant of pirozhki is a common fast food in Armenia and Azerbaijan. In Armenia it often contains a potato or seasoned meat filling. In Azerbaijan it is usually made with jam, mashed potatoes, or ground beef.

Central Asia
Pirozhki are common as fast food on the streets of the Central Asian countries in Kazakhstan, Tajikistan, Uzbekistan, Turkmenistan, Kyrgyzstan, where they were introduced by the Russians.  They are also made by many Russians and non-Russians at home.

Finland
The Finnish version is the similar , a popular street food made with donut dough, minced meat and rice.

Iran

It is commonly filled with pastry cream, but potato and meat fillings are also available.

Japan
The dish was introduced to Japan by White Russian refugees who sought shelter there after the Bolshevik Revolution of 1917. A localized Japanese version, called , are predominantly fried, use fillings such as ground meat, boiled egg, bean noodles, and spring onion, and are commonly breaded with panko before frying, in the manner of Japanese . Another popular variation is filled with Japanese curry and is quite similar to karē-pan, which is itself said to be inspired by pirozhki.

Mongolia
Pirozhki is also very common as fast food in Mongolia, and it is made throughout the country by families at home.

See also

Banitsa
Börek
Bougatsa
Cantiq
Chiburekki
Coulibiac
Empanadas
Fatayer
Knish
Lihapiirakka
List of Russian dishes
Pasty
Peremech
Pierogi
Pogača
Samosas
Turnover (food)
Uchpuchmak
Vatrushka

Notes

References

Sources 

 Piroshki or Pirozhki in Larousse Gastronomique, The New American Edition (Jenifer Harvey Lang, ed.), Crown Publishers, New York (1988), p. 809.
 Piroghi or Pirozhki in Larouse Gastronomique, first English language edition (Nina Froud and Charlotte Turgeon, eds.), Paul Hamlyn, London (1961), p. 740-741.
 Pirog in The Oxford Companion to Food (Alan Davidson), Oxford University Press (1999), p.p. 609-610.
 Speķa rauši in "Latviska un Moderna Virtuve" (The Latvian and Modern Kitchen), Fischbach D.P. Camp, Germany, 1949; pg. 24, original in Latvian and translated into English

Russian cuisine
Ashkenazi Jewish cuisine
Russian desserts
Soviet cuisine
Greek cuisine
Serbian cuisine
Estonian cuisine
Iranian cuisine
Azerbaijani cuisine
Armenian cuisine
Central Asian cuisine
Mongolian cuisine
Japanese cuisine
Savoury pies
Snack foods
Street food
Stuffed dishes
National dishes
Street food in Russia
Foods with jam